Pasquale Fabbri (born 2 April 1942) is an Italian racing cyclist. He rode in the 1966 Tour de France.

References

External links
 

1942 births
Living people
Italian male cyclists
Place of birth missing (living people)
Sportspeople from the Province of Forlì-Cesena
Cyclists from Emilia-Romagna